Palava may refer to:

 Palava City, a city in the Indian state of Maharashtra
 Palavas-les-Flots, a commune on the French Mediterranean coast
 Palava , a taxonomic synonym of the plant genus Palaua

See also
 Palav (disambiguation)
 Palaver (disambiguation)
 Pallava (disambiguation)
 Polava, a river of Saxony, Germany and of the Czech Republic